Alisma wahlenbergii, the Baltic water-plantain, is a species of plant in the family Alismataceae. It is native to the area around the northern Baltic Sea: Finland, Sweden, Estonia, Latvia, Lithuania, and northern and northwestern Russia.

Alisma wahlenbergii is classed as a "threatened" species.

References

External links
Den virtuella floran: Småsvalting, Alisma wahlenbergii 
Artfakta, Swedish Species Information Centre,  småsvalting, Alisma wahlenbergii
Altervista Botanika, Alisma wahlenbergii
Комнатные цветы и растения - Частуха Валенберга (Alisma wahlenbergii)
Proflowers, Частуха Валенберга (Alisma wahlenbergii)

wahlenbergii
Freshwater plants
Flora of Sweden
Flora of Finland
Flora of the Baltic states
Flora of North European Russia
Flora of Northwest European Russia
Plants described in 1933